The German Aerospace Center (abbreviated DLR, literally German Center for Air- and Space-flight) is the national center for aerospace, energy and transportation research of Germany, founded in 1969. It is headquartered in Cologne with 35 locations throughout Germany. The DLR is engaged in a wide range of research and development projects in national and international partnerships. DLR also acts as the German space agency and is responsible for planning and implementing the German space programme on behalf of the German federal government. As a project management agency, DLR coordinates and answers the technical and organisational implementation of projects funded by a number of German federal ministries.
As of 2020, the German Aerospace Center had a national budget of €1.261 billion.

Overview 

DLR has approximately 10.000 employees at 30 locations in Germany. Institutes and facilities are spread over 13 sites, as well as offices in Brussels, Paris and Washington, D.C. DLR has a budget of €1 billion to cover its own research, development and operations. Approximately 49% of this sum comes from competitively allocated third-party funds (German: Drittmittel). In addition to this, DLR administers around €860 million in German funds for the European Space Agency (ESA). In its capacity as project management agency, it manages €1.279 billion in research on behalf of German federal ministries. DLR is a full member of the Consultative Committee for Space Data Systems and a member of the Helmholtz Association of German Research Centres.

In the context of DLR's initiatives to promote young research talent, ten DLR School Labs were set up at Technische Universität Darmstadt, Technische Universität Hamburg-Harburg, RWTH Aachen, Technische Universität Dresden and in Berlin-Adlershof, Braunschweig, Bremen, Cologne-Porz, Dortmund, Göttingen, Lampoldshausen/Stuttgart, Neustrelitz, and Oberpfaffenhofen over the past years. In the DLR School Labs, pupils can become acquainted with the practical aspects of natural and engineering sciences by conducting interesting experiments.

The members of the DLR executive board are Anke Kaysser-Pyzalla (chairman) since August 2015, Klaus Hamacher (vice chairman) since April 2006, Karsten Lemmer (member for Energy and Transport) since March 2017
and  Walter Pelzer since 2021.

History 

The modern DLR was created in 1997, but was the culmination of over half a dozen space, aerospace, and research institutes from across the 20th century.

The oldest predecessor organization of DLR was established by Ludwig Prandtl in Göttingen in 1907.

In parallel he was acting in collaboration with Fritz von Opel as one of the heads of Opel RAK, a private venture leading to the first manned rocket cars and rocket planes which paved the way for the Nazi era V2 program and US and Soviet activities from 1950 onwards. The Opel RAK program and the spectacular public demonstrations of ground and air vehicles drew large crowds, as well as caused global public excitement, and had a large  impact on later spaceflight pioneers. The Great Depression put an end to the program and briefly after its break-up, Valier eventually was killed while experimenting as part of VfR activities in collaboration with Heylandt-Werke on liquid-fueled rockets in April 1930. He is considered the first fatality of the early space age. Valier's protégé Arthur Rudolph went on to develop an improved and safer version of Valier's engine. Valier and von Opel had engaged in a program that led directly to use of jet-assisted takeoff for heavily laden aircraft. Their experiments had also a tremendous influence on Alexander Lippisch, whose experience with the rocket-powered  ("Duck") eventually paved the way to the Messerschmitt Me-163, the first operational rocket fighter craft. The private experiments of the late 1920s and early 1930s excited also the interest of the German military, which provided funding for further development of rockets as a replacement for artillery. This led to an array of military applications, among them Germany's V-2 terror weapon, the world's first ballistic missile, and also the first human-made object to surpass the Kármán line and thus leaving the earth's atmosphere.

In the 1940s, the DVL (an AVA sister organization) funded Konrad Zuse's work on the Z3 and Z4 computers. Another German aviation technology research facility, the 1935-founded, top-secret  at Völkenrode which conducted research – much of it for military aviation to suit the Luftwaffe's needs – in parallel to the then-existing forerunners of the DLR of today, would not be discovered by the Allies until after the war's end.

In 1954, the Research Institute of Jet Propulsion Physics (FPS) was established at the Stuttgart airport.

In 1989, the DFVLR was renamed  (DLR;  "German Research Institute for Aviation and Space Flight").

The shorter translation "German Aerospace Center" is used in English-language publications.

This should not be confused with DLR's  located in Bremen. Also, significant contributions are made to the European Space Agency.

Research 

DLR's mission comprises the exploration of the Earth and the solar system, as well as research aimed at protecting the environment and developing environmentally compatible technologies, and at promoting mobility, communication and security. DLR's research portfolio, which covers the four focus areas Aeronautics, Space, Transportation and Energy, ranges from basic research to innovative applications. DLR operates large-scale research centres, both for the benefit of its own projects and as a service for its clients and partners from the worlds of business and science.

The objective of DLR's aeronautics research is to strengthen the competitive advantage of the national and European aeronautical industry and aviation sector, and to meet political and social demands – for instance with regard to climate-friendly aviation. German space research activities range from experiments under conditions of weightlessness to the exploration of other planets and environmental monitoring from space. In addition to these activities, DLR performs tasks of public authority pertaining to the planning and implementation of the German space programme, in its capacity as the official space agency of the Federal Republic of Germany. DLR's Project Management Agency (German: Projektträger im DLR) has also been entrusted with tasks of public authority pertaining to the administration of subsidies. In the field of energy research, DLR is working on highly efficient, low- power generation technologies based on gas turbines and fuel cells, on solar thermal power generation, and on the efficient use of heat, including cogeneration based on fossil and renewable energy sources. The topics covered by DLR's transportation research are maintaining mobility, protecting the environment and saving resources, and improving transportation safety.

In addition to the already existing projects Mars Express, global navigation satellite system Galileo, and Shuttle Radar Topography Mission, the Institute of Space Systems (German: Institut für Raumfahrtsysteme) was founded in Bremen on 26 January 2007. In the future, 80 scientists and engineers will be doing research into topics such as space mission concepts, satellite development and propulsion technology.

Planetary research

Mars Express 

The High Resolution Stereo Camera HRSC is the most important German contribution to the European Space Agency's Mars Express mission. It is the first digital stereo camera that also generates multispectral data and that has a very high resolution lens. The camera records images of the Martian surface which formed the basis for a large number of scientific studies. With the HRSC, which was developed at the German Aerospace Center's Institute of Planetary Research (German: Institut für Planetenforschung), it is possible to analyse details no larger than 10 to 30 meters in three dimensions.

Rosetta and Philae 

The comet orbiter Rosetta is controlled from the European Space Operations Centre (ESOC), in Darmstadt, Germany. The DLR has provided the structure, thermal subsystem, flywheel, the Active Descent System (procured by DLR but made in Switzerland), ROLIS, downward-looking camera, SESAME, acoustic sounding and seismic instrument for Philae, the orbiter's landing unit. It has also managed the project and did the level product assurance. The University of Münster built MUPUS (it was designed and built in Space Research Centre of Polish Academy of Sciences) and the Braunschweig University of Technology the ROMAP instrument. The Max Planck Institute for Solar System Research made the payload engineering, eject mechanism, landing gear, anchoring harpoon, central computer, COSAC, APXS and other subsystems.

Dawn 
The framing cameras, provided by the Max Planck Institute for Solar System Research and the DLR, are the main imaging instruments of Dawn, a multi-destination space probe to the protoplanets 4 Vesta and 1 Ceres launched in 2007. The cameras offer resolutions of 17 m/pixel for Vesta and 66 m/pixel for Ceres. Because the framing cameras are vital for both science and navigation, the payload has two identical and physically separate cameras (FC1 & FC2) for redundancy, each with its own optics, electronics, and structure.

Human spaceflight

Columbus 

DLR operates the Columbus Control Centre in Oberpfaffenhofen, Germany. It is responsible for the coordination of scientific activities as well as for systems operations and life support on board the orbiting Columbus laboratory.

In February 2008, the Columbus laboratory, Europe's core contribution to the International Space Station ISS, was brought into space by the Space Shuttle and docked to the ISS. It is planned to enable researchers on Earth to conduct thousands of experiments in biology, materials science, fluid physics and many other fields under conditions of weightlessness in space.

Spacelab, Shuttle, Mir, Soyuz 
Germany has near ten astronauts and participates in ESA human space programs including flights of German astronauts aboard US Space Shuttles and Russian spacecraft. Besides missions under ESA and flights on Soyuz and Mir, two Space Shuttle missions with the European built Spacelab were fully funded and organizationally and scientifically controlled by Germany (like a separate few by ESA and one by Japan) with German astronauts on board as hosts and not guests. The first West German mission Deutschland 1 (Spacelab-D1, DLR-1, NASA designation STS-61-A) took place in 1985.

The second similar mission, Deutschland 2 (Spacelab-D2, DLR-2, NASA designation STS-55), was first planned for 1988, but then due to the Space Shuttle Challenger disaster was delayed until 1993 when it became the first German human space mission after German reunification.

Earth-bound research and aeronautics

Remote sensing of the Earth 
In remote sensing of the Earth, satellites provide comprehensive and continually updated information on "System Earth". This remote sensing data is used to investigate the Earth's atmosphere, land and ocean surfaces, and ice sheets. Practical applications of this technology include environmental monitoring and disaster relief.

Following the Indian Ocean tsunami of 26 December 2004, for instance, up-to-date maps could be compiled very quickly using Earth observation satellites. These maps could then be used for orientation during relief missions. DLR conducts these research activities at the German Remote Sensing Data Center (DFD) (German: Deutsches Fernerkundungsdatenzentrum), a DLR institute based in Oberpfaffenhofen. Nowadays, satellite data is also important for climate research: it is used to measure temperatures,  levels, particulate matter levels, rainforest deforestation and the radiation conditions of the Earth's surface (land, oceans, polar ice).

TerraSAR-X 
The new German Earth observation satellite TerraSAR-X was launched in June 2007. The objective of this five-year mission is to provide radar remote sensing data to scientific and commercial users. The satellite's design is based on the technology and expertise developed in the X-SAR and SRTM SAR missions (Synthetic Aperture Radar). The sensor has a number of different modes of operation, with a maximum resolution of one meter, and is capable of generating elevation profiles.

TerraSAR-X is the first satellite that was jointly paid for by government and industry. DLR contributed about 80 percent of the total expenses, with the remainder being covered by EADS Astrium. The satellite's core component is a radar sensor operating in the X band and capable of recording the Earth's surface using a range of different modes of operation, capturing an area of 10 to 100 kilometers in size with a resolution of 1 to 16 meters.

Astronomical surveys
The Uppsala–DLR Trojan Survey (UDTS) was a search for asteroids near Jupiter in the 1990s, in collaboration with the Swedish Uppsala Astronomical Observatory. When it concluded there was another survey, the Uppsala–DLR Asteroid Survey, this time with a focus on Near Earth asteroids and both surveys discovered numerous objects.

Reusable launch systems

Suborbital Spaceplane 
Studying a suborbital spaceplane, DLR conducted Falke prototype for Hermes spaceplane program, participates in non-realized Sanger II project and since 2005 work under the concept making fast intercontinental passenger transport possible. The SpaceLiner is a reusable vehicle lifting-off vertically and landing like a glider.

RETALT 
DLR is a partner for RETALT (RETro Propulsion Assisted Landing Technologies), a program aiming to develop two-stage-to-orbit and single-stage to orbit reusable launch systems.

Aircraft design 
DLR is involved in different European H2020 projects (AGILE, AGILE4.0) concerning aircraft design with the objective to improve multidisciplinary optimization using distributed analysis frameworks.

Research aircraft 

DLR operates Europe's largest fleet of research aircraft. The aircraft are used both as research objects and as research tools. DLR's research aircraft provide platforms for all kinds of research missions. Scientists and engineers can use them for practical, application-oriented purposes: Earth observation, atmospheric research or testing new aircraft components. DLR is for instance investigating wing flutter and possible ways of eliminating it, which would also help to reduce aircraft noise. So-called "flying simulators" can be used to simulate the flight performance of aircraft that have not been built yet. This method was for instance used to test the Airbus A380 in the early stages of its development. The VFW 614 ATTAS was used to test several systems.

The high-altitude research aircraft HALO (High Altitude and Long Range Research Aircraft) will be used for atmospheric research and Earth observation from 2009. With a cruising altitude of more than 15 kilometers and a range of over 8,000 kilometers, HALO will provide for the first time the capability to gather data on a continental scale, at all latitudes, from the tropics to the poles, and at altitudes as high as the lower stratosphere.

The Airbus A320-232 D-ATRA, the latest and largest addition to the fleet, has been in use by the German Aerospace Center since late 2008. ATRA (Advanced Technology Research Aircraft) is a modern and flexible flight test platform which sets a new benchmark for flying test beds in European aerospace research – and not just because of its size.

DLR and NASA jointly operate the flying infrared telescope SOFIA (Stratospheric Observatory for Infrared Astronomy). A Boeing 747SP with a modified fuselage enabling it to carry a reflecting telescope developed in Germany is used as an airborne research platform. The aircraft is operated by the Dryden Flight Research Center at Site 9 (USAF Plant 42) in Palmdale, California. Observation flights will be flown 3 or 4 nights a week, for up to eight hours at a time and at an altitude of 12 to 14 kilometers. SOFIA has been designed to remain operational for a period of 20 years. It is the successor to the Kuiper Airborne Observatory (KAO), which was deployed from 1974 to 1995.

On 31 January 2020, the DLR put its newest aircraft into service, a Falcon 2000LX ISTAR (In-flight Systems & Technology Airborne Research).

Emissions research 

DLR conducts research into  and noise emissions caused by air transport. In order to ensure that increasing traffic volumes do not lead to an increase in the noise pollution caused by air transport, DLR is investigating options for noise reduction. The "Low-noise Approach and Departure Procedures" research project (German: Lärmoptimierte An- und Abflugverfahren), for instance, forms part of the national research project "Quiet Traffic" (German: Leiser Verkehr). The objective of this project is to find flight procedures that can reduce the amount of noise generated during takeoff and landing. One approach is to analyse noise propagation at ground level during takeoff using a large number of microphones. Researchers are also trying to reduce the noise at source, focusing for instance on airframe and engine noise. They hope to minimise noise generated in the engines using so-called "antinoise".

The German Aerospace Center's research work on  emissions caused by air transport focuses for instance on model calculations concerning the effects of converting the global aircraft fleet to hydrogen propulsion. The growth rates of aviation are above average. This raises the question if  emission-free hydrogen propulsion could perhaps limit the effects of growing air traffic volumes on the environment and the climate.

Hydrogen as an energy carrier 
The Hydrosol and Hydrosol-2 is one of the energy research projects in which DLR scientists are engaged. For the first time, scientists have achieved thermal water splitting using solar energy, generating hydrogen and oxygen without  emissions. For this achievement, the DLR team and several other research groups received the Descartes Prize, a research award created by the European Commission.  The FP6 Hydrosol II pilot reactor (around 100 kW) for solar thermochemical hydrogen production at the Plataforma Solar de Almería in Spain started in November 2005 and is in operation since 2008.

Traffic Congestion

During the 2006 FIFA World Cup football championship, DLR implemented the Soccer project aimed at preventing traffic congestion. In this transportation research project, traffic data was obtained from the air in Berlin, Stuttgart and Cologne and used as input for traffic forecasting. A sensor system combining a conventional and a thermographic camera was used to obtain the data. A zeppelin, an aeroplane and a helicopter served as flying research platforms. An image analysis software package generated aerial photos showing the current traffic parameters as well as traffic forecasts. In this way, traffic control centres could be provided with almost-real-time traffic information, and road users could be diverted whenever necessary.

Solar tower power plant 

In 2007, the first commercially operated solar tower power plant, the PS10 solar power tower, was commissioned. It has a capacity of eleven megawatt and it is located near Sevilla, in Sanlúcar la Mayor (Spain). DLR is prominently involved in developing the technology for this type of power plant. In solar tower power plants, sun-tracking mirrors (heliostats) redirect the solar radiation onto a central heat exchanger (receiver) on top of a tower. This generates high-temperature process heat, which can then be used in gas or steam turbine power plants to generate electrical power for the public electricity grid. In the future, solar thermal tower plant technology could also be used to generate solar fuels, such as hydrogen, without  emissions.

Locations 

As of 2022, the DLR had 35 sites in Germany:

Aachen and Aachen-Merzbrück
 Small Aircraft Technology

Augsburg
 Augsburg-Universitätsviertel
 Center for Lightweight Production Technology (Zentrum für Leichtbauproduktionstechnik)

Berlin
 Berlin-Adlershof
Institute of Planetary Research (Institut für Planetenforschung)
 Institute of Transport Research (Institut für Verkehrsforschung)
 Institute of Optical Sensor Systems (Institut für Optische Sensorsysteme)
 Applied Remote Sensing Cluster
 Project Management Agency - Information Technology
 Institute of Space Systems, Department of System Conditioning (Abt. Systemkonditionierung)
 DLR School Lab
 Located at TU Berlin
 Institute of Propulsion Technology, Department of Engine Acoustics (Abt. Triebwerksakustik)
 Berlin-Charlottenburg
 Berlin-Carnot-Strasse
 Berlin-Zentrum
 Project Management Agencies at DLR
 Simulation and Software Technology

Bonn
 Bonn-Oberkassel
 Space Agency (Raumfahrt-Agentur)
 Project management for aerospace research and technology (Projektträger Luftfahrtforschung und -technologie)
 DLR Project Management Agency (DLR-Projektträger)
 International Office of the Federal Ministry of Education and Research (BMBF) - pursues the goal of expanding the international connections of German universities, research institutions and companies
 EUREKA/COST Office
 EU Office of the BMBF
 Bonn-Bad Godesberg
 DLR Project Management Agency (DLR-Projektträger)

Braunschweig
 Flight operations
 Institute of Aerodynamics and Fluid Mechanics
 Institute of Composite Structures and Adapative Systems
 Institute of Flight Control (Flugführung)
 Institute of Flight Systems Engineering
 Institute of Transportation Systems
 Institute of Software Engineering
 German-Dutch Wind Tunnels (DNW)
 DLR School Lab

Bremen
 Institute of Space Systems
 Maritime Security Centre
 DLR School Lab

Bremerhaven
 Institut for the Protection of Maritime Infrastructures

Cologne
 Executive Board (Vorstand)
 Institute of Airport Operations and Air Traffic
 Institute of Propulsion Technology 
 Institute of Aerospace Medicine
 Institute of Material Physics in Space
 Institute of Materials Research
 Institute of Aerodynamics and Fluid Mechanics, Köln Wind Tunnel Department
 Institute of Technical Thermodynamics, Solar Research Department
 Space flight and astronaut training
 Simulation and Software Engineering
 Center for Solidification of Supercooled Melts (ZEUS) (Zentrum für Erstarrung Unterkühlter Schmelzen)
 DLR School Lab
 German-Dutch Wind Tunnels (DNW)

Cochstedt
 National Experimental Test Center for Unmanned Aircraft Systems

Cottbus and Zittau
 Institute of Low-Carbon Industrial Processes

Dresden
 Institute of Software Methods for Product Virtualization

Geesthacht
 Institute of Maritime Energy Systems

Göttingen
 Institute of Aerodynamics and Fluid Mechanics
 Institute of Aeroelasticity
 Institute of Drive Systems
 German-Dutch Wind Tunnels (DNW)
 DLR School Lab
 DLR Systems Engineering (Systemhaus Technik)
 DLR Technology Marketing
 DLR Central Archive

Hanover
 Institute for Satellite Geodesy and Inertial Sensing

Hamburg
 Department of Aerospace Psychology (besides research, also involved in the selection of astronauts and Lufthansa pilots) 
 Institute of Aerospace Medicine
 Research Center for Air Transport Systems 
 DLR School Lab

Jena
 Institute of Data Science

Jülich
 Institute for Solar Research
 Institute for Future Fuels

Lampoldshausen
 Institute of Space Propulsion
 Institute of Technical Physics

Neustrelitz
 Institute of Communications and Navigation: GNSS Validation and Completion Techniques (Validierungs- und Ergänzungstechniken)
 Institute of Communications and Navigation: Ionospheric Effects and Corrections
 Remote Sensing Technology Institute: Atmospheric Processes (Atmosphärenprozessoren)
 German Remote Sensing Data Centre - National Ground Segment
 Technology Marketing
 DLR School Lab

Oberpfaffenhofen 
 Applied Remote Sensing Cluster
 Space Operations and Astronaut Training
 German Remote Sensing Data Center (DFD)
 Flight Operations
 Institute of Microwaves and Radar Systems (Institut für Hochfrequenztechnik und Radarsysteme)
 Institute of Communications and Navigation (Institut für Kommunikation und Navigation)
 Institute of Remote Sensing Technology
 Institute of Atmospheric Physics (Institut für Physik der Atmosphäre)
 Institute of Robotics and Mechatronics (Institut für Robotik und Mechatronik)
 Institute of System Dynamics and Control (Institut für Systemdynamik und Regelungstechnik)
 German Space Operations Center (Deutsches Raumfahrt-Kontrollzentrum)
 DLR School Lab

Oldenburg
 Institute of Networked Energy Systems (Institut für Vernetzte Energiesysteme)

Rheinbach
 Institute for the Protection of Terrestrial Infrastructures

St. Augustin
 Institute for the Protection of Terrestrial Infrastructures
 Institute for AI Safety and Security

Stade
 Institute of Composite Structures and Adaptive Systems
 Center for Lightweight Production Technology

Stuttgart
 Institute of Structures and Design
 Institute of Vehicle Concepts
 Institute of Technical Physics
 Institute of Engineering Thermodynamics
 Institute of Combustion Technology
 Institute of Networked Energy Systems (Institut für Vernetzte Energiesysteme)
 DLR School Lab

Trauen
 Institute of Propulsion Technology, Engine / Fire Safety department

Ulm
 Institute of Engineering Thermodynamics
 Institute of Quantum Technologies
 Institute for AI Safety and Security

Weilheim (Oberbayern)
 Space Operations and Astronaut Training

Human spaceflight
Examples of DLR or parent institution human spaceflight missions:
FSLP (1983), with Ulf Merbold using Spaceman on STS-9
D1 (1985), with Reinhard Furrer and Ernst Messerschmid ( with Netherlands' Wubbo Ockels on STS-61-A)
D2 (1993), with Hans Schlegel and Ulrich Walter
Mir 92/92E (1992), with Klaus-Dietrich Flade
Euromir 94, with Ulf Merbold
Euromir 95, with Thomas Reiter
MIR '97, with Reinhold Ewald
X-SAR/SRTM (2000), with Gerhard Thiele
Blue dot (2014), with Alexander Gerst, on the ISS
Horizons (2018), with Alexander Gerst, on the ISS

Research aircraft

Examples of research aircraft:
Bo 105 (for ATTHeS In-Flight Simulator)
EC 135 (for Flying Helicopter Simulator (FHS))
VFW 614 (for ATTAS)
Boeing 747SP (DLR/NASA project for SOFIA)
Airbus A320-232 ("D-ATRA")
Zeppelin NT (for traffic analysis)
Cessna 208B Grand Caravan ("D-FDLR")
Dassault Falcon 20E ("D-CMET")
DG 300 Elan-17 (glider)
Dornier 228-101 ("D-CODE")
Dornier 228-212 ("D-CFFU")
DR 400/200R Remorqueur ("D-EDVE")
Gulfstream G550 ("D-ADLR", for HALO)
LFU 205 ("D-ELFU", since 1985)
Grob Strato 2C ("D-CDLR", retired)

Space missions

Examples of DLR (or parent institution) space missions. Many of these are also joint or international missions.

Current
TanDEM-X - TerraSAR-X add-on for Digital Elevation Measurement
Prisma
SATCOMBw
TerraSAR-X
Columbus
BIRD - Bispectral InfraRed Detector
FIREBIRD, the BIRD successor mission consisting of TET-1 (Technology Experiment Carrier) and BIROS (Bispectral InfraRed Optical Satellite, formerly Berlin InfraRed Optical Satellite)
GRACE - Gravity Recovery And Climate Experiment
SAR-Lupe
EuCROPIS (Euglena and Combined Regenerative Organic-Food Production in Space)
DESIS, the DLR Earth Sensing Imaging Spectrometer, a VIS/NIR hyperspectral imager on the International Space Station developed together with Teledyne Brown Engineering
EnMAP

Past
CHAMP - CHAllenging Minisatellite Payload
AZUR
AEROS
Dawn (spacecraft)
HELIOS
AMPTE
GALILEO
ROSAT
EXPRESS
Equator-S
MOMS-2P
ABRIXAS
SYMPHONIE A+B
TV-Sat 1 & 2
DFS Kopernikus 1,2,3
EUTELSAT II (F1, F2, F3, F4, F5, F6)
EUTELSAT W (W2, W3, W4, W1R, HB6, W5)
Rosetta
Automated Transfer Vehicle (ATV)
MASCOT lander onboard Hayabusa2

DLR Magazine
DLR Magazine is the institute's flagship publication, also published in English as of June 2010. Subject matter includes science, editorials and images.

See also
 Open access in Germany
 Die Astronautin
 List of aerospace flight test centres
 List of government space agencies

References

External links 

 Homepage of the DLR
 DLR Homepage English
 DLR School Lab  Schülerlabor
 Website of the Washington DC DLR Office
 Helmholtz Community (HGF)

Space agencies
Research institutes in Germany
Aviation in Germany
Space technology research institutes
Aeronautics organizations
Organisations based in Cologne
Porz
Space programme of Germany
1969 establishments in Germany
Organizations established in 1969
Aerospace research institutes